Dawes County is a county in the U.S. state of Nebraska. As of the 2010 United States Census, the population was 9,182. Its county seat is Chadron. The county was formed in 1885; it was named for James W. Dawes, the Nebraska Governor at the time.

In the Nebraska license-plate system, Dawes County is represented by the prefix 69 (it had the 69th-largest number of vehicles registered when the license-plate system was established in 1922).

History
Dawes County was a part of the unorganized area of northwestern Nebraska until February 19, 1877, when it became a part of Sioux County from which it was separated February 19, 1885 and was given its present name.

Geography
Dawes County lies on the north border of Nebraska. Its north boundary line abuts the south boundary line of the state of South Dakota.

Since it lies in the western part of Nebraska, Dawes County residents observe Mountain Time. The eastern two-thirds of the state observes Central Time.

Major highways

  Nebraska Highway 2
  Nebraska Highway 71

Adjacent counties

 Oglala Lakota County, South Dakota - northeast
 Sheridan County - east
 Box Butte County - south
 Sioux County - west
 Fall River County, South Dakota - northwest

National protected areas
 Nebraska National Forest (part)
 Pine Ridge National Recreation Area
 Oglala National Grassland (part)

State protected areas
 Box Butte Reservoir State Recreation Area
 Chadron State Park
 Fort Robinson State Park (part)
 Chadron Creek Ranch State Wildlife Management Area
 Bordeaux State Wildlife Management Area
 Bighorn State Wildlife Management Area
 Ponderosa State Wildlife Management Area

Demographics

As of the 2000 United States Census, there were 9,060 people, 3,512 households, and 2,086 families in the county. The population density was 6 people per square mile (3/km2). There were 4,004 housing units at an average density of 3 per square mile (1/km2). The racial makeup of the county was 93.34% White, 0.81% Black or African American, 2.88% Native American, 0.31% Asian, 0.06% Pacific Islander, 1.03% from other races, and 1.58% from two or more races. 2.43% of the population were Hispanic or Latino of any race. 38.0% were of German, 9.9% English, 9.2% Irish and 7.4% American ancestry.

There were 3,512 households, out of which 26.20% had children under the age of 18 living with them, 48.50% were married couples living together, 7.90% had a female householder with no husband present, and 40.60% were non-families. 31.00% of all households were made up of individuals, and 12.90% had someone living alone who was 65 years of age or older.  The average household size was 2.28 and the average family size was 2.87.

The county population contained 21.20% under the age of 18, 23.40% from 18 to 24, 20.40% from 25 to 44, 20.30% from 45 to 64, and 14.80% who were 65 years of age or older. The median age was 31 years. For every 100 females there were 95.60 males. For every 100 females age 18 and over, there were 91.10 males.

The median income for a household in the county was $29,476, and the median income for a family was $41,092. Males had a median income of $29,162 versus $17,404 for females. The per capita income for the county was $16,353. About 9.80% of families and 18.90% of the population were below the poverty line, including 14.40% of those under age 18 and 9.80% of those age 65 or over.

Communities

Cities
Chadron (county seat)
Crawford

Village
Whitney

Unincorporated communities

 Bordeaux
 Horn
 Marsland
 Pine Ridge

Ghost town
 Belmont

Politics
Dawes County voters have been reliably Republican for decades; in no national election since 1936 has the county selected the Democratic Party candidate (as of 2020).

See also
 National Register of Historic Places listings in Dawes County, Nebraska

Further reading

 Brown, Franz Karl. "The farmers of Dawes County, Nebraska" (MS thesis. California State University, Northridge, 1987) online.

 

 Sandstrom, Michael. "Travails Of The 'Magic City' The Great Depression In Dawes County." Nebraska History Fall2021, Vol. 102 Issue 3, pp 132-151.

References

 
Nebraska counties
1885 establishments in Nebraska
Populated places established in 1885